The 2016–17 ABA League was the 16th season of the ABA League, with 14 teams from Serbia, Croatia, Slovenia, Montenegro, Bosnia and Herzegovina and the Republic of Macedonia participating in it. It started on September 29, 2016, with the first round of the regular season and the regular season ended on March 13, 2017, followed by playoffs of the four best placed teams. The play-offs were played from March 18 till April 13, 2017. Crvena zvezda won its third ABA League championship, after beating Cedevita 3–0 in the Finals.

Teams

National standings
The numbers of teams by country is determined by a coefficient that is the sum of all victories clubs from a certain country achieve in a regular season divided by the number of clubs from that country. By using this coefficient majority of places for current season are allocated, while the remaining places are given via wild cards from league board.

Team allocation 
On 25 July 2016 the Adriatic Basketball Association agreed to expel Union Olimpija and Helios Suns as the first was not able to fulfill the financial obligations required and the second did not follow the position of all the clubs of the Association in the FIBA-Euroleague controversy. Finally, Union Olimpija was re-admitted in the league and Macedonian runner-up Karpoš Sokoli replaced Helios Suns.

League positions of the previous national league season after playoffs shown in parentheses (RW: Regular season winners).

Venues and locations

Personnel and sponsorship

Coaching changes

Regular season

League table

Results

Playoffs

The semi-finals were played in a best-of-three format, while the Finals were played in a best-of-five format. The Playoffs started on March 18 and ended on April 13, 2017.

Final standings

Statistical leaders
After the end of the Regular Season.

| width=50% valign=top |

Points

 

|}

|}

| width=50% valign=top |

Assists

|}

|}Source:

Awards

MVP

Finals MVP

Top Prospect

Ideal Starting Five

Source:

MVP List

MVP of the Round

Source:

MVP of the Month

2016–17 national standings

Source:

ABA League clubs in European competitions

See also 
 List of current ABA Liga team rosters

2016–17 domestic competitions
  2016–17 Basketball League of Serbia
  2016–17 A-1 League
  2016–17 Slovenian Basketball League
  2016–17 Prva A liga
  2016–17 Basketball Championship of Bosnia and Herzegovina
  2016–17 Macedonian First League

References

External links 
 Official website
 ABA League at Eurobasket.com

 
2016-17

2016–17 in European basketball leagues
2016–17 in Serbian basketball
2016–17 in Slovenian basketball
2016–17 in Croatian basketball
2016–17 in Bosnia and Herzegovina basketball
2016–17 in Montenegrin basketball
2016–17 in Republic of Macedonia basketball